Michael Eric Robinson (born March 11, 1956) is an American composer associated with both contemporary classical music and computer music. His work is influenced by jazz, Indian classical music and European musical traditions.

Life 
Born in New York, New York, in 1956, Robinson was raised in Long Island, NY, earning the Louis Armstrong award in 1974. Robinson studied at SUNY Potsdam (with a BM in Composition from the Crane School of Music) followed by graduate study at CalArts. Private studies included jazz improvisation with Lee Konitz, Paul Jeffrey, Ken McIntyre and Indian classical music with Harihar Rao and Pandit Jasraj - as well as composition studies with John Cage, Morton Feldman, David Lewin, Charles Dodge and Steve Reich. Additional education included summer programs at Tanglewood with Leonard Altman, Gunther Schuller, Jacob Druckman, John Chowning, Ralph Shapey and Leonard Bernstein.

As a composer and musicologist, Robinson has been a lecturer at UCLA, Bard College, California State University at Long Beach and California State University at Dominguez Hills. His recordings are in the music library collections of New York University, Princeton University, and the University of California at Los Angeles. A comprehensive collection of Robinson’s scores are used for study and teaching purposes at New York University.

Composition style and process 
Robinson's work has been described by Titus Levi as a musical rendering of abstract expressionism. In Keyboard Magazine he explains in his 1991 Discoveries article featuring Robinson: "Robinson’s sense of timing, phrasing, form, and flow guide listeners toward his alternative vision. His music has the clarity and ingenuousness of Chinese brush painting, some of the hard geometric edginess of Kandinsky, and a detached, ethereal, and abstract quality that nonetheless seems bound to the tight forms found in some abstract Expressionist paintings."

Christina V. Godbey of The Los Angeles Times (May 30, 1992) wrote of Robinson’s process: “Michael Robinson is a composer of the modern age...Since 1985, he has written compositions exclusively for the computer, and it has produced some rather unusual sounds. Robinson composes music with traditional notations on paper before it is translated and encoded into the computer.”

Amanda MacBlane describes Michael Robinson's style and process in her August 2002 NewMusicBox article: "Making use of alternative tunings and blending tradition with technology, Robinson is able to transcend cultural and spiritual boundaries."

Robinson has composed over 400 works and has released over 100 albums. His musical style is informed by American, South Asian, and European traditions. "...his production methodology is also unique: although the performance of a typical Robinson piece sounds as if spontaneous improvisation is involved, his compositions are, amazingly, entirely programmed using the Meruvina and thus fully notated.”

Piano improvisations 
Known for his electronic works on the Meruvina, Michael Robinson is also an accomplished pianist, releasing three solo piano albums in 2021. As published in All About Jazz, Hrayr Attarian describes his piano recordings as: "A mix of originals and radically reimagined standards..."

Selected discography 
 Green Garnets (Azure Miles Records) 2022
 Jetavana (Azure Miles Records) 2022
 Gregorian Winter (Azure Miles Records) 2022
 Joy Unknown (Azure Miles Records) 2022
 Another World (Azure Miles Records) 2022
 In My Tree (Azure Miles Records) 2022
 A Parrot Sipping Tea (Azure Miles Records) 2021
 Taffeta Patterns (Azure Miles Records) 2021
 Lotus-Pollen (Azure Miles Records) 2020
 The Waters' Child (Azure Miles Records) 2020
 Queen Of Space (Azure Miles Records) 2020
 Spirit Lady (Azure Miles Records) 2019
 Dazzling Darkness (Azure Miles Records) 2019
 Tunis Phantom (Azure Miles Records) 2019
 Nectar-Spells (Azure Miles Records) 2018
 Mango-Bird (Azure Miles Records) 2018
 Viridian Seas (Azure Miles Records) 2017
 Lilac Dawn (Azure Miles Records) 2017
 Celestial Crocodile & Honu Morning (Azure Miles Records) 2016
 Hummingbird Canyon (Azure Miles Records) 2014
 Lucknow Shimmer (Azure Miles Records) 2013
 Nightmarchers (Azure Miles Records) 2012
 Emerald Anklets (Azure Miles Records) 2012
 Amethyst Labyrinth (Azure Miles Records) 2011
 Peridot Pond (Azure Miles Records) 2011
 Summer Morning (Azure Miles Records) 2010
 Bhairava (Azure Miles Records) 2010
 Todi (Azure Miles Records) 2009
 Natabhairavi (Azure Miles Records) 2007
 Dhani (Azure Miles Records) 2003
 Mian Ki Malhar (Azure Miles Records)  2002
 Puriya Dhanashri (Azure Miles Records) 2002
 Bhimpalasi (Azure Miles Records) 2001
 Kaunsi Kanada (Azure Miles Records) 2000
 Sagarmatha (Azure Miles Records) 1998
 The Listening Earth (Azure Miles Records) 1998
 Chinese Legend (Azure Miles Records) 1997
 Rainbow Thunder (Azure Miles Records) 1996
 Hamoa (Azure Miles Records) 1995
 Fire Monkey (Azure Miles Records) 1994
 Robinson Gardens (Azure Miles Records) 1994
 Sea of France (Azure Miles Records) 1991
 Trembling Flowers (Azure Miles Records) 1991

Further reading 
 All About Jazz (2022) - Michael Robinson: Piano Improvisation Series https://www.allaboutjazz.com/michael-robinson-piano-improvisation-series
 Fifteen Questions (2021) - Michael Robinson about La Monte Young, Tuning & Indian Classical Music https://15questions.net/interview/michael-robinson-about-la-monte-young-tuning-indian-classical-music/page-1/
 Fifteen Questions (2021) - Michael Robinson About Improvisation https://www.15questions.net/interview/michael-robinson-about-improvisation/page-1/
 The Culturium - Michael Robinson: Touch a Colour (August 2020) https://www.theculturium.com/michael-robinson-touch-a-colour/
 Michael Robinson: Lilac Dawn (March 2017) http://textura.org/archives/r/robinson_lilacdawn.htm
 Ten Questions With Michael Robinson (April 2015) http://www.textura.org/reviews/tenquestions_michaelrobinson.htm
 New Music World (June–March 2017) https://newmusicworld.org/tag/cds-dvds/
 Nightmarchers ~ Michael Robinson (February 2013) https://acloserlisten.com/2013/02/13/michael-robinson-nightmarchers/
 15 Questions: Michael Robinson (2012) http://www.tokafi.com/15questions/15-questions-michael-robinson/
 Electronic Music http://www.electronicmusic.com/features/reviews/music/robinsonchnslgnd.html
 Luminous Realms by Michael Robinson (June 1998) http://www.jazzreview.com/cd-reviews/world-music-cd-reviews/luminous-realms-by-michael-robinson.html
 The Instrument is Alive: An Interview with Ustad Zakir Hussain by Michael Robinson (2002) for UCLA's Pacific Review of Ethnomusicology (Volume 10, Number 1, pages 80–96) http://ethnomusicologyreview.ucla.edu/journal/volume/10

References

External links 
 Official website

1956 births
21st-century American composers
21st-century classical composers
American contemporary classical composers
Crane School of Music alumni
Living people